The 2011 Red River flood took place along the Red River of the North in Manitoba in Canada and North Dakota and Minnesota in the United States beginning in April 2011. The flood was, in part, due to high moisture levels in the soil from the previous year, which meant that further accumulation would threaten the flood-prone region. Flood predictors in Winnipeg were worried that a dual crest of both the Assiniboine River and the Red might crest at the city at the same time. Beginning around April 8, 50 homes were evacuated and two more were flooded after an ice jam in St. Andrews, Manitoba caused the river to flood over its banks.

Three fatalities in the US were blamed on the flood by April 8. Through most of Southern Manitoba, the Red River crest level was below major floods of the past, including those of 1979 and 1950. When the river crested at the James Avenue pumping station in Winnipeg, north of the confluence of the Red and Assiniboine rivers, the measured open-water crest was 19.59 above datum. The high crest at the James Avenue pumping station was attributed largely to flooding of the Assiniboine River.

Assiniboine flood
The Assiniboine at Brandon, Manitoba reached the highest level ever recorded for the river. The 2011 Assiniboine River Flood was a 300-year flood. That year flood levels on the Red River were below those of 2009.

Officials said that, if the flood controls had not been constructed in the 1960s and later along the Red and Assiniboine rivers near Winnipeg, the cresting water level would have amounted to the sixth-highest water levels ever recorded in the city. Higher levels were recorded in 1861, 2009, 1997, 1852, and 1826 (by order of highest level first in this list).

Fatalities in US and Manitoba, Canada

Three fatalities in the United States were blamed on the flood by 8 April. One man died while sandbagging in Fargo-Moorhead. The other two American men drowned in the Maple River when their boat capsized while they were hunting beavers. A Canadian man died in Niverville, Manitoba on 9 April; his vehicle skidded off a flooded road and submerged before he could escape.

References

External links
 "Flood webcams", Winnipeg Free Press

Floods in Canada
Flood,2011,Red River
Flood, Red River
Flood, Red River
Natural disasters in North Dakota
Natural disasters in Minnesota
Red River Flood, 2011
Red River Flood, 2011
Red River Flood, 2011
Red River Flood, 2011
Red River Flood, 2011
Red River Flood, 2011
Red River Flood, 2011
Red River Flood, 2011
Red River Flood, 2011
Red River floods